Clay John Schexnayder (born February 25, 1969) is an American businessman and politician from Ascension Parish, Louisiana, currently serving as Speaker of the Louisiana House of Representatives. Schexnayder succeeded John LaBruzzo in the Louisiana House of Representatives in 2012.

Early life and education
Schexnayder is the son of Perry P. Schexnayder and the former Dorothy Ann Demars (1937–2009). In 1989, Schexnayder graduated from French Settlement High School. Two years later, he graduated from the Allen Institute in Atlanta, Georgia, where he studied basic automotive mechanics.

Career 
A former race car driver, he participated in competition in the circuit encompassing Louisiana, Mississippi, and Arkansas circuit. He was formerly employed by the Firestone Tire and Rubber Company. Since 1998, he has operated Car Craft Automotive in Sorrento, Louisiana. He was a former part-time sheriff's deputy in Ascension Parish, Louisiana.

In his legislative campaign, Schexnayder promised to seek more jobs to the state and to strengthen infrastructure and education. Schexnayder ran with the backing of Governor Bobby Jindal and the outgoing Republican Representative Mert Smiley in District 89, who was instead elected as the Ascension Parish assessor. The Tea Party movement labeled Schexnayder a "tax and spend Republican" and refused to support him."

Personal life 
Schexnayder and his wife, Phoebe (née Keller), have four children.

References

 

|-

1969 births
21st-century American politicians
Businesspeople from Louisiana
Living people
Republican Party members of the Louisiana House of Representatives
People from Ascension Parish, Louisiana
People from Livingston Parish, Louisiana
Racing drivers from Louisiana
Speakers of the Louisiana House of Representatives